Inspector General of Prisons, shortened to IG of Prisons or IG Prisons, is the highest rank in the provincial prison and probation service, usually the provincial commanding and controlling officer and chief/head of all district, central, special and women jails/prisons, borstal institutions,  and remand homes in a province in Bangladesh, India or Pakistan.

See also
DIG Prisons
AIG Prisons
Senior Superintendent of Jail
Superintendent of Jail

References 

Prison officers ranks in India
Prison officers ranks in Pakistan
Prison officers ranks in Bangladesh